Jalan Kota Baharu (Perak state route A110) is a major road in Perak, Malaysia.

List of junctions

Kota Baharu